Milheirós may refer to the following places in Portugal:

Milheirós (Maia), a parish in the municipality of Maia
Milheirós de Poiares, a parish in the municipality of Santa Maria da Feira